The Olympus E-5 was Olympus Corporation's flagship camera, positioned as a professional DSLR camera. It is the successor to the Olympus E-3, which was launched on October 17, 2007. The E-5 was announced on September 14, 2010. The E-5, like the other cameras in the Olympus E-series, conforms to the Four Thirds System.

Features
The E-5 has a live preview full articulating screen, contrast-detect autofocus in live view mode, and the ability to control up to three wireless flash groups without external transmitters. The camera is also fully weatherproof even with the popup flash in the "up" position when used with weatherproofed lenses such as the Zuiko Digital "High Grade" and "Super High Grade" lines. Like many recent DSLR's, it can record video; the E-5 supports resolutions up to 720p. It is very similar to the E-3 that preceded it in operation and design.

Additional features include:
 Fast autofocus (Olympus claims that this was the world's fastest autofocus at the time the camera was released (when used with the Olympus Zuiko Digital ED 12-60mm f/2.8-4 SWD lens at 60mm, as of September 14, 2010).
 100% viewfinder with ×1.15 magnification with a 50 mm lens (as 25 mm is the "standard" lens on the 4/3 format, this is equivalent to ×0.57 in 35 mm format)
 External white balance sensor
 5 frames per second (frame/s) capture speed
 11 point biaxial cross AF sensor that works at −2 EV at ISO 100
 Sensor-shift image stabilization which can be used with any lens
 Environmentally sealed magnesium alloy camera body
 Dust reduction system (Supersonic Wave Filter)
 Shutter tested to 150,000 cycles
 Internal Viewfinder shutter
 'X' sync and External remote ports

The camera is compatible with existing BLM-1 batteries used in the E-1, E-3, E-300, E-30, E-500 and E-510.

Recent iterations of Olympus DSLR's (including the E-420, E-520, E-620, E-30, and E-3) have used a relatively strong antialias filter. This has the effect of eliminating moire and aliasing artifacts, but reduces the camera's ability to capture very fine detail when used with very sharp lenses. In the E-5, Olympus has chosen to use a much weaker antialias filter along with a new software demosaicing/sharpening algorithm that is claimed to preserve fine detail while eliminating moire. In principle this approach allows the E-5 to capture more fine detail than cameras with similar resolution (when used with sufficiently sharp lenses).

Along with other Olympus 4/3rds bodies, the E-5 has an on-demand pixel mapping, a dust reduction system, vignetting and distortion correction either in-camera or during editing with Olympus software.

References

External links 

E-5
Live-preview digital cameras
Four Thirds System
Cameras introduced in 2010